Afrotachys is a genus of ground beetles in the family Carabidae. This genus has a single species, Afrotachys brincki. It is found in South Africa.

References

Trechinae
Monotypic Carabidae genera